The Club Harmony was a cruise ship, last owned by Polaris Shipping and operated by Harmony Cruises. She was built in 1969 by the Wärtsilä Turku Shipyard in Turku, Finland as the container ship Axel Johnson for the Sweden-based Rederi AB Nordstjernan and operated on their Johnson Line services. In 1986 she was sold to Regency Cruises with the intention of being converted into a cruise ship under the name Regent Sun, but she was laid up instead. In 1988 the ship was acquired by Costa Cruises, renamed Costa Marina and rebuilt into a cruise ship at the T. Mariotti shipyard in Genoa, Italy. She entered service as the Costa Marina in 1990. From 2002 she was marketed more towards German passengers.

On August 3, 2011 it was announced by parent company Carnival that new ships would be built for Costa to replace their older ships, starting with the Costa Marina.

The Costa Marina left the fleet in November 2011, and was initially replaced by Iberocruceros' Grand Voyager for her Red Sea cruises.  Costa Marina was chartered to South Korea’s Harmony Cruise and renamed Harmony Princess with Marshall Islands registry, for cruises between Korea and Japan. In 2012, her owners renamed her Club Harmony, but she was laid up in January 2013.

In September 2014, she was sold for scrap in India and arrived at Alang the following month as Harmony 1.

References

External links
 Costa Cruises

Ships of Costa Cruises
Ships built in Turku
1969 ships
Container ships